Taishevo (Tayış) is a rural locality (a village) in Imendyashevsky Selsoviet, Gafuriysky District, Bashkortostan, Russia. The population was 176 as of 2010. There are 4 streets.

Geography 
Taishevo is located 55 km northeast of Krasnousolsky (the district's administrative centre) by road. Tash-Asty is the nearest rural locality.

References 

Rural localities in Gafuriysky District